Eclipsys Corporation was a publicly traded American company that provided hospitals and other healthcare organizations with electronic medical record, computerized physician order entry, and other technology, as well as revenue cycle management software. Eclipsys was founded in 1995, and had its headquarters in Atlanta, Georgia.

History

Eclipsys was founded in 1995 by Harvey J. Wilson, who remained with the company until 2002. In 1998, the company acquired Motorola's Emtek Healthcare Division, a provider of point-of-care clinical information software. In 2008, the company acquired physician practice management software and electronic health records company MediNotes. The company restructured in 2006, and Philip Pead became chief executive officer in 2009. In 2010, Eclipsys announced a strategic partnership with Microsoft, in which the companies will share technology and promote healthcare information technology interoperability. Eclipsys merged with Allscripts in August 2010.

References

External links
 Allscripts

Companies based in Atlanta
Software companies based in Georgia (U.S. state)
Health care companies based in Georgia (US State)
Defunct software companies of the United States
1995 establishments in the United States
Software companies established in 1995
Companies established in 1995